The Qasr al-Hosn (literally "Hassan Palace") is a historical landmark and the oldest stone building in the city of Abu Dhabi, the capital of the United Arab Emirates. It was designed by Mohammed Al Bastaki and built in 1761.

Location 
It is located along Rashid Bin Saeed Al Maktoum St and is a part of the Abu Dhabi Cultural Foundation.

History 
Qasr al-Hosn, also known as the White Fort (originally not white in colour but painted bright white during 1976–1983 renovations) or Old Fort, was constructed in 1761 as a conical watchtower to defend the only freshwater well in Abu Dhabi island. The tower was later expanded into a small fort in 1793 by the then ruler, Shakhbut bin Dhiyab Al Nahyan, and became the permanent residence of the ruling Sheikh. The tower took its present shape after a major extension in the late 1930s, aided by revenues received for granting the first oil license in Abu Dhabi. It remained the emir's palace (hence the name Qasr al-Hosn, meaning Palace fort) and seat of government until 1966. The fort has been developed several times and is now partially open to the public.

Current use 
The Qasr al-Hosn is currently the subject of extensive historical, archaeological, and architectural research. The fort houses a museum displaying artifacts and pictures representing the history of the country. It also has a range of weapons, used through the region's history, on display.

Qasr al-Hosn festival 
Qasr al-Hosn festival is an annual 11-day cultural event staged on the grounds of the fort. The fort is open to the public during the festival, including some of the restricted areas and features live music and dance performances showing the UAE's cultural heritage.

References

External links 
 
 
 

Buildings and structures in Abu Dhabi
Infrastructure completed in 1761
Infrastructure completed in 1793
Forts in the United Arab Emirates
Tourist attractions in Abu Dhabi
1761 establishments in Asia